Seven Worlds is a 1998 solo album by Eric Johnson. It contains songs recorded between 1976 and 1978 – after disbanding with his previous band The Electromagnets – that were intended to be Johnson's first solo album. Due to various disputes, general release was held up until Johnson gave permission to Ark 21 to finally release the master recordings, more than twenty years after the album was recorded. The rights to the Seven Worlds recordings are owned by a previous manager. Johnson subsequently re-recorded the tracks "Zap" and "Emerald Eyes" for his first general release album, 1986's Tones.

Track listing
All songs written by Eric Johnson, except where noted.
"Zap" – 3:22
"Emerald Eyes" (Johnson, Jay Aaron Podolnick) – 3:18
"Showdown" (Johnson, Jay Aaron Podolnick) – 3:59
"Missing Key" – 3:43
"Alone with You" – 6:13
"I Promise I Will Try" – 2:41
"Winter Came" – 4:56
"Turn the Page" – 3:49
"A Song for Life" – 2:29
"By Your Side" – 3:37

Personnel
 Eric Johnson – guitar, lead vocals, Fender Rhodes electric piano, piano, lap steel guitar
 Jay Aaron – vocals
 Christopher Cross – vocals
 Liza Farrow – vocals
 Kim Wilson – harmonica
 Nick Phelps – trumpet
 Jimmy Martin – guitar
 Steve Barber – synthesizers
 Roscoe Beck – bass guitar
 Kyle Brock – bass guitar
 David Dennard – bass
 Bill Maddox – drums
 Mark Singer – drums
 Linda Wetherby – viola da gamba

References

Eric Johnson albums
Ark 21 Records albums
1998 albums